Clay Township is one of nine townships in Decatur County, Indiana. As of the 2010 census, its population was 1,287 and it contained 535 housing units.

History
Clay Township was organized in 1836.

Champ's Ford Bridge was added to the National Register of Historic Places in 2009.

Geography

Unincorporated towns
 Burney
 Ewington
 Horace
 Milford
(This list is based on USGS data and may include former settlements.)

Adjacent townships
 Adams Township (northeast)
 Washington Township (east)
 Sand Creek Township (southeast)
 Jackson Township (south)
 Clifty Township, Bartholomew County (southwest)
 Haw Creek Township, Bartholomew County (west)
 Noble Township, Shelby County (northwest)

Major highways
  Indiana State Road 3
  Indiana State Road 46

Cemeteries
The township contains seven cemeteries: Center Grove, Columbia, Mowery, Nauvoo, Patrick, Pumphrey and Swinney.

References
 
 United States Census Bureau cartographic boundary files

External links

 Indiana Township Association
 United Township Association of Indiana

Townships in Decatur County, Indiana
Townships in Indiana
1836 establishments in Indiana
Populated places established in 1836